Harcourt Garden is a small urban park in Admiralty, Hong Kong, constructed in the mid-1990s. To the east of the park is the Hong Kong Police Headquarters while to the west is Admiralty bus station. Like the adjacent Harcourt Road, the park is named for Admiral Cecil Harcourt, de facto governor of Hong Kong from September 1945 to June 1946.

History
The park is on land reclaimed from Victoria Harbour in 1863.

As part of the large naval and military installations that dominated this area until the 1970s and 1980s, this site was formerly occupied by the Wellington Battery and the Military Hospital, all associated with the Wellington Barracks. The adjacent military arsenal is recalled in the name of Arsenal Street.

In 2013 to 2018, the garden was closed due to the expansion of Admiralty station for the South Island Line and the Sha Tin to Central Link.

Refurbishment
As of 2020, the park has been reopened after the construction directly below the site for the extension of Admiralty station. This expansion houses the terminus platforms of the new MTR South Island line (East) and Sha Tin to Central Link.

See also
List of urban public parks and gardens in Hong Kong

References

External links
 

Admiralty, Hong Kong
Urban public parks and gardens in Hong Kong